Kalateh-ye Arab or Kalateh Arab may refer to:
 Kalateh-ye Arab, Razavi Khorasan
 Kalateh-ye Arab, South Khorasan
 Kalateh-ye Arabha